is a Shinto shrine in Ikoma, Nara, Japan. Generally called . The formal name of the shrine is "". This shrine is also known as "Ikoma-Taisha", which means "great shrine of Ikoma".

History

According to the Sokoku-Fudoki, an ancient record of Japan, this shrine was extant in 458. The original object of worship at the shrine was a mountain, Mount Ikoma, behind the shrine.  This shrine has a long relationship with the Japanese royal family and the dynasty. In Engishiki, a formal record on shrines written in 972, this shrine was given the title of "Kanpei-dai" as very high rank among Japanese shrines.

Patron deities

Today, this shrine is dedicated to seven gods, Ikomatsu-Hikono-Kami, Ikomatsu-Himeno-Kami, Okinaga-Tarashihimeno-Mikoto (Empress Jingū), Tarashinakatsu-Hikono-Mikoto (Emperor Chūai), Hondawakeno-Mikoto (Emperor Ōjin), and Katsuragi-Takanukahimeno-Mikoto (mother of Empress Jingū), Okinaga-Sukuneono-Mikoto (father of Empress Jingū). Ikomatsu-Hikono-Kami and Ikomatsu-Himeno-Mikoto are understood to be husband and wife, and are embodied by Mount Ikoma itself.

Cultural Property

This shrine has the Ikoma-Mandara, or "Mandala of Ikoma", and the Mandala was selected as an Important Cultural Property by the Japanese government.

This shrine is also well known as a shrine of fire, and the Japanese royal family use the Shinboku or sacred woods of the shrine, as firewood at the Daijosai ceremony. In October, the shrine has the Hi-matsuri or the "festival of fire".

References
 
Nihon Kotsu Kosha, Nara, Nihon Kotsu Kosha, 1984, p. 137.
Japanese version of Wikipedia

Access

The entrance station to the shrine is Ichibu Station of Kintetsu Ikoma Line. About 5 minute walk from the station.

Gallery

Shinto shrines in Nara Prefecture